This is a list of transfers in Serbian football for the 2018–19 winter transfer window.
 Moves featuring Serbian SuperLiga and Serbian First League sides are listed.
 The order by which the clubs are listed is equal to the classification at the mid-season of the 2018–19 Serbian SuperLiga and 2018–19 Serbian First League.

Serbian SuperLiga

Red Star Belgrade

In:

Out:

Radnički Niš

In:

 

Out:

Partizan

In:

Out:

Čukarički

In:

Out:

Napredak Kruševac

In:

Out:

Mladost Lučani

In:

Out:

Proleter Novi Sad

In:

Out:

Vojvodina

In:

Out:

Radnik Surdulica

In:

Out:

Mačva Šabac

In:

Out:

Voždovac

In:

Out:

Spartak Subotica

In:

Out:

Bačka BP

In:

Out:

Rad

In:

 

Out:

Zemun

In:

Out:

Dinamo Vranje

In:

Out:

Serbian First League

Javor Ivanjica

In:

Out:

Inđija

In:

Out:

TSC Bačka Topola

In:

Out:

Zlatibor Čajetina

In:

Out:

Sinđelić Beograd

In:

Out:

Metalac G. M.

In:

Out:

Radnički Kragujevac

In:

Out:

Bežanija

In:

Out:

Trayal

In:

Out:

Žarkovo

In:

Out:

Bečej

In:

Out:

Borac Čačak

In:

Out:

Budućnost Dobanovci

In:

Out:

Teleoptik

In:

Out:

Sloboda Užice

In:

Out:

Novi Pazar

In:

Out:

See also
Serbian SuperLiga
2018–19 Serbian SuperLiga
Serbian First League
2018–19 Serbian First League

Notes

References

Serbian SuperLiga
2018-19
transfers